A. Srinivasa Raghavan ({b. 23 October 1905 - d. 5 January 1975),  was a Tamil poet, writer, orator, and professor from Tamil Nadu, India. He was also popularly known by his initials as Aa. See. Ra.

Biography
Srinivasa Raghavan was born in Kandiyur near Thiruvaiyaru. He completed his schooling in Nagapattinam and graduated from St. Joseph's College, Tiruchirapalli. He worked as a lecturer in the same college and the Vivekananda College, Chennai for some time. He also published two magazines - Sindhanai (a Tamil monthly) and Triveni (an English monthly). He published his works using the pseudonym Vagulaparanan.(). He worked as a professor of English at St. Xavier's College, Chennai and M. D. T. Hindu College, Tirunelveli. During 1951-69 served as its Principal of V.O.C. College, Tuticorin. In 1968, he was awarded the Sahitya Akademi Award for Tamil for his collection of poetry Vellai Paravai (lit. The White Bird). He died in 1975. A complete edition of his works was published posthumously in 2005.

Partial bibliography
Vellai Paravai (poetry collection)
Nigumbalai
Avan Amaran
Gowthami
Udhaya Kanni (play)
Mel Karru
Ilakkiya Malargal
Kaaviya Arangil
Gurudevarin Kural
Pudhu Merugu (literary commentary)
Bharathiyin Kural (essay)
Kambanilil irundhu sila idhazhgal (essay)
Nammazhwar (biography)

References

Further reading

1905 births
1975 deaths
Poets from Tamil Nadu
Recipients of the Sahitya Akademi Award in Tamil
Tamil writers
People from Thanjavur district
St Joseph's College, Tiruchirappalli alumni
Indian Tamil people
20th-century Indian poets